Togo competed at the 1984 Summer Olympics in Los Angeles, United States.  The nation returned to the Olympic Games after missing both the 1976 and 1980 Games.

Athletics

Men
Track & road events

Field events

Boxing

Men

References
Official Olympic Reports

Nations at the 1984 Summer Olympics
1984
Summer Olympics